Anika Taher is a Bangladeshi model and beauty pageant titleholder who was crowned Miss Bangladesh 1994 and represented Bangladesh at Miss World 1994.

References

Bangladeshi beauty pageant winners
Bangladeshi female models
Living people
Miss World 1994 delegates
Year of birth missing (living people)